The terms free flap, free autologous tissue transfer and microvascular free tissue transfer are synonymous terms used to describe the "transplantation" of tissue from one site of the body to another, in order to reconstruct an existing defect.  "Free" implies that the tissue is completely detached from its blood supply at the original location ("donor site") and then transferred to another location ("recipient site") and the circulation in the tissue re-established by anastomosis of artery(s) and vein(s).  This is in contrast to a "pedicled" flap in which the tissue is left partly attached to the donor site ("pedicle") and simply transposed to a new location; keeping the "pedicle" intact as a conduit to supply the tissue with blood.

Various types of tissue may be transferred as a "free flap" including skin and fat, muscle, nerve, bone, cartilage (or any combination of these), lymph nodes and intestinal segments.  An example of "free flap" could be a "free toe transfer" in which the great toe or the second toe is transferred to the hand to reconstruct a thumb.

For all "free flaps", the blood supply is reconstituted using microsurgical techniques to reconnect the artery (brings blood into the flap) and vein (allows blood to flow out of the flap).

Free autologous tissue transfer is performed by many surgical specialties.

Indications
Free flaps are used to reconstruct tissue defects. Particularly when postoperative radiotherapy is indicated, vascularized free tissue is preferred over non-vascularized free tissue.

Breast reconstruction:
Aesthetic (cosmetic) reconstruction: Most commonly creating a breast after a mastectomy.  This may happen at the time of mastectomy or at a later date.  Free flaps are usually only done if a TRAM flap is not possible. Plastic surgeons usually perform these surgeries. Patients with Bell's palsy can have their face re-animated using "free functioning muscle flaps".

Hand reconstruction:
Reconstruction of paralyzed face or hand using functioning free muscle flaps.

Head and Neck reconstruction:

When reconstructing complex head and neck defects, the reconstruction often requires bone and soft tissue from a distant donor site to be harvested. Functional reconstruction in the head and neck area often requires reconstruction of the oral cavity, the jawbone and the dental occlusion. Type of defects include:
Reconstruction of post-traumatic defects: Some areas of the body has missing tissue either from a trauma or from some existing wound.  This may include areas on the leg where bone is exposed or any other area on the body that needs soft tissue coverage.
Reconstruction of a defect following removal of a tumor in the mouth or elsewhere: Soft tissue resection requires soft tissue reconstruction. Composite (soft tissue and hard tissue) resection requires composite reconstruction. Soft tissue flaps include the radial forearm free flap and the ALT (anterolateral thigh) free flap amongst others. Composite free flaps include the fibular free flap, the DCIA free flap, the scapular free flap and the composite radial free flap amongst others. When the cancer resection involves a part of the lower jaw, depending on the patients age and the patients co-morbidities one composite free flap will be preferred over the others for reconstruction of the defect.
Reconstruction of esophageal (food-pipe) continuity using segments of intestine

Surgical Steps during "free autologous tissue transfer"

  A defect is created surgically (either following removal of a tumor or following cleansing of a wound)
  An incision is made over the area from where the flap will be taken.
  The flap is dissected and freed from the surrounding tissue.
  At least one vein and one artery (which constitutes the vascular pedicle) are dissected.  
  The vein and artery (vascular pedicle) are divided, separating the flap from the rest of the body.
  Before the pedicle is divided, the area the flap will be re-attached to is prepared by identifying a recipient artery and vein.
  The free flap is brought up to the defect area, and the vein and artery from the flap (vascular pedicle) are anastomosed (re-connected) to the vein and artery identified in the wound.  The anastomosis is done using a microscope or a "loupe", hence it is termed "microsurgery"
  The free flap is sutured to the defect, while it is monitored to ensure the blood vessels remain patent (i.e. the vessels have good blood flow).
  The donor site area is closed primarily. Sometimes a Split Thickness Skin graft (STSG) may be performed and placed on top of the defect site and/or the donor site.

Postoperative Complications/Sequelae
The most common serious complication of a free flap is loss of the venous outflow (e.g. a clot forms in the vein that drains the blood from the flap). Loss of arterial supply is serious too and both will cause necrosis (death) of the flap. Close monitoring of the flap both by nurses and by the surgeon is mandatory following the completion of the operation. If detected early, loss of either the venous or arterial blood supply may be corrected by operative intervention. Many times an implantable Doppler probe or other devices can be installed during surgery to provide better monitoring in the post-operative period. The Doppler probe can be removed before discharge from the hospital.

Usually the harvest of a "free flap" is performed in such a fashion to cause the least amount of disability. Despite this some disability may occur following removal of this tissue from the "donor site".

Other complications/sequalae which may occur with any surgery are also possible, including infection and pain.

See also
Flap (surgery)
Rotation flap
TRAM flap
Microsurgery
List of plastic surgery flaps
Perforator flaps

Bibliography

References 

Oral and maxillofacial surgery
Plastic surgery